Mynor Haroldo Escobar Espinoza (born June 10, 1964) professionally known as Mynor Escobar, is a Guatemalan architect, Visual Artist, painter, political and writer. Escobar is best known for his pictorial series called TUKUR. Escobar is the author of the books Blue Eyes (poetry), Versus and other tales and Stories of a Tukur.

Early life and education 
Escobar was born on June 10, 1964 in Guatemala, Central America to Alfredo Escobar and Zulma Lili Espinoza Martínez. He grew up in an integrated Catholic family along with two younger brothers Rodmy and Zulma Avalesca. His father was a politician, a medalist swimmer, and a musician.

After graduating from the Colegio Marista Liceo Coatepeque with a high school, Escobar studied at the University of San Carlos de Guatemala, earning a bachelor’s degree in Architecture. In 1989 he was appointed as a student representative of the Faculty of Architecture.

Career 
Escobar began his career when he was still in university. In 1985 he joined the Youth branch of the newly founded Democratic Socialist Party. During this time, Escobar received political training courses and worked alongside the party leader, Mr. Mario Solórzano Martínez. When he was 21 years old, Escobar became a young candidate for deputy to the Central American Parliament for the National List, in the first so-called democratic General Elections in Guatemala, that took place during the internal armed conflict. Escobar then joined the Trade Union Movement, working from the Toral National Union of Plastic Artists -SINTAP.

During this period, Escobar started his career as an artist. He began the self-training process by enrolling in human figure classes with the architect and painter Juan José Rodríguez. It was in 1985 he organized his first personal exhibition in the facilities of the Faculty of Architecture of the University of San Carlos de Guatemala. At the same time, Escobar also became an assistant professor of Means of Expression at the Faculty of Architecture.

In 1987, Escobar joined the School of Graphic Design, the Faculty of Architecture of the University of San Carlos de Guatemala. He also assumed the post of an Assistant Professor from the painters and architects Salvador Gálvez Mora and Efraín Amaya and later served as a professor.

A year later, Escobar also started working for Prensa Libre, a communication medium company. He worked for two years on the internal process of editorial re-adaptation of Children's Magazine Chicos. For over a decade, Escobar worked at the university and also as a freelancer at several Guatemalan advertising agencies.

In 2009, Escobar joined the Higher School of Art as a teacher, an academic institution as a Coordinator of the Bachelor of Visual Arts. In the same year, he gave life to the cultural radio magazine La Galería, under the theme of contemporary Guatemalan art. For two years he took interviews for this radio magazine of contemporary Guatemalan artists, ultimately documenting an archive with a hundred interviews on university radio.

Escobar’s work over the years has become a subject of study by Guatemalan research centers and universities that seek to document the work of Guatemalan artists. In 2020 he was also honored at the 23 Historic Center Festival de Guatemala, an event sponsored by the Municipality of Guatemala City, the Ministry of Culture and Sports, the Guatemalan Institute of Tourism, the University of San Carlos de Guatemala, and sponsored by La Cervecería Centroamericana in the short film - Mynor Escobar, Discovering Tukur, an audiovisual project, where he was the protagonist.

Style 
Escobar is known for his pictorial work, recognized as Tukur Painting, explicit themes, use of language (in poetry), and the links established via art to tradition and culture. His work is full of imagery, and symbolism and imbibes a background of comprehensibility, originality, significant formal & cultural elements. Escobar's work is completely anthropological and contains elements of popular culture.

His work revolves around conscious intentions, on issues of recognition and affirmation of cultural identity both at the personal level and at the ethnic-social group level. Escobar's artistic language goes beyond the pre-Columbian and colonial roots of Guatemalan official culture. It is highly expressive and aims at finding a balance that functions as an ideal within the national imagination.

Personal life 
Escobar is the father of Alessandra, Camila and Rodrigo.

References 

1964 births
Living people
Guatemalan architects